Claude Allen could refer to: 

Claude Allen (born 1960), American attorney and government official
Claude Allen (athlete) (1885–1979), American track and field athlete and basketball coach

See also
Claudia Allen (born 1954), American playwright